Amma or AMMA may refer to:

Acronym 
 American Medical Marijuana Association
 Amhara Mass Media Agency (created in 1993), a media organisation in Amhara Region in Ethiopia
 Association of Malayalam Movie Artists
 Assistant Masters' and Mistresses' Association, former British trade union

People 
 Anasuya Devī (1923–1985), Indian spiritual guru
 J. Jayalalithaa (1948–2016), Former Chief Minister of Tamil Nadu
 Mata Amritanandamayi (born 1953), Indian spiritual guru known as "the hugging saint"
 Amma Sri Karunamayi (born 1958), Indian spiritual guru
 Amma Asante (born 1969), British screenwriter and director
 Amma Asante (politician) (born 1972), Dutch politician
 Kollakkayil Devaki Amma (born ), Indian forester

Film 
 Amma (1949 film), a Sri Lankan film
 Amma (1952 film), an Indian Malayalam film
 Amma (1968 film), an Indian Kannada film
 Amma (1976 film), an Indian Malayalam film directed by M. Krishnan Nair
 Amma (1986 film), a 1986 Hindi-language Indian feature film
 Amma Rajinama, a 1991 Indian Telugu film directed by Dasari Narayana Rao
 Amma (2003 film), an Indian Hindi film
 Amma (2018 film), an Indian film

Other 
 Amma, Iran, a village in Ilam Province, Iran
 Amma, West Virginia, an unincorporated community in Roane County, West Virginia, US
 Amma (deity), the supreme creator according to the Dogon people of Mali
 Amma ("grandmother"), the ancestress of the freemen in Norse mythology; see Rígsþula
 Amma (TV series), a 2016 Hindi-language Indian crime drama television series

See also